Julien Cagnina (born 4 June 1994) is a Belgian tennis player.

Cagnina has a career high ATP singles ranking of 239 achieved on 30 October 2017. He also has a career high ATP doubles ranking of 353 achieved on 10 October 2015.

Cagnina represents Belgium at the Davis Cup, where he has a W/L record of 0–1.

Future and Challenger finals

Singles 28 (17–11)

Davis Cup

Participations: (0–1)

   indicates the outcome of the Davis Cup match followed by the score, date, place of event, the zonal classification and its phase, and the court surface.

External links

1994 births
Living people
Belgian male tennis players
Sportspeople from Liège